Juliette Nothomb (born 27 October 1963 Kinshasa) is a Belgian writer.

Life
Juliette Nothomb was born in Kinshasa, and she grew up in many countries: Japan, United States, China, and Laos.

She has written cookbooks and books for children. She works for publications like Le Vif/L'Express or Télépro.

In 2020, she participated in an online international book fair (salon du livre international sur internet).

In 2021, she signed a letter supporting Alexei Navalny. She was interviewed on  "La Table des bons vivants".

Family 
Her sister is Amélie Nothomb. Their father, Patrick Nothomb, was a diplomat.

Selected works

Books
 La cuisine d'Amélie : 80 recettes de derrière les fagots, 2008.  
 Des souris et des mômes, 2010.  
 La vraie histoire de la femme sans tête, 2011.  
 Carrément biscuits, 2012. 
 Carrément pralines, 2013. 
 Les sept canailles de la Bleue Maison, 2014. 
 Pénurie dans la galaxie, 2017. 
 Aimer Lyon : 200 adresses à partager, 2018.

Books in English 
 Totally godiva. W W Norton, 2014.

References

1963 births
Living people
Belgian children's writers
Belgian women children's writers
Belgian bloggers
Belgian women bloggers
Cookbook writers